The first USS Hiawatha (SP-183) was an armed yacht that served in the United States Navy as a patrol vessel from 1917 to 1920.

Hiawatha was built as the civilian steam yacht Donaire in 1914 by George Lawley & Son of Neponset, Massachusetts. The U.S. Navy acquired her from her owner, A. W. Stanley of Miami, Florida, for World War I service as a patrol vessel. She was commissioned as USS Hiawatha (SP-183) at the Norfolk Navy Yard in Portsmouth, Virginia, on 10 May 1917.

Assigned to the 5th Naval District, Hiawatha operated in Hampton Roads, Virginia, and vicinity as a patrol craft and dispatch boat during World War I. From August to December 1918, she was one of two U.S. Navy ships in service simultaneously as USS Hiawatha, the other being the tug USS Hiawatha (ID-2892).

After the war, Hiawatha remained inactive at Norfolk, Virginia, until loaned to the Maryland State Conservation Commission on 11 December 1919. She was returned to the U.S. Navy on 16 March 1920.

On 1 October 1920, the Navy sold Hiawatha to the U.S. Department of Agriculture, which took her to the Territory of Alaska for use in the administration of National Forests there by the United States Forest Service.

References

Department of the Navy: Naval Historical Center: Online Library of Selected Images: U.S. Navy Ships: USS Hiawatha (SP-183), 1917-1920
NavSource Online: Section Patrol Craft Photo Archive Hiawatha (SP 183)

Patrol vessels of the United States Navy
World War I patrol vessels of the United States
Ships built in Boston
1914 ships
Steam yachts